Back to the Woods is the second studio album by American rapper Angel Haze. It was released independently on September 14, 2015. The album was supported by three singles: "Impossible", "Babe Ruthless" and "Moonrise Kingdom".

Critical reception
The album was praised by critics. It received an average score of 82 on Metacritic, which assigns a weighted mean rating out of 100 to reviews from mainstream critics, indicating "universal acclaim".

Track listing

References

2015 albums
Angel Haze albums
Self-released albums